Jim Mann may refer to:

 Jim Mann (baseball) (born 1974), American professional baseball pitcher
 Jim Mann (scientist) (born 1944), New Zealand nutritionist and endocrinologist